Awamori (Okinawan: , 'āmui) is an alcoholic beverage indigenous and unique to Okinawa, Japan. It is made from long grain indica rice, and is not a direct product of brewing (like sake) but of distillation (like shōchū).  The majority of awamori made today uses indica rice imported from Thailand, as the local production is largely insufficient to meet domestic demand.

Awamori is typically 60–86 proof (30–43% alcohol), although "export" brands (including brands shipped to mainland Japan) are increasingly 50 proof (25% alcohol). Some styles (notably hanazake) are 120 proof (60%) and are flammable.  Awamori is aged in traditional clay pots to improve its flavor and mellowness.

The most popular way to drink awamori is with water and ice. When served in a restaurant in Okinawa, it will nearly always be accompanied by a container of ice and carafe of water.  Awamori can also be drunk straight, on the rocks, and in cocktails. Traditionally, awamori was served in a kara-kara, a small earthen vessel with a small clay marble inside. The marble would make a distinctive "kara-kara" sound to let people know the vessel was empty. These vessels are still found in Okinawa, but the clay marbles are often absent.

In general, the price of awamori increases with the beverage's age.

Kōrēgusu is a type of hot sauce made of chillis infused in awamori and is a popular condiment to Okinawan dishes such as Okinawa soba.

History

Awamori owes its existence to Okinawa's trading history. It originates from the Thai drink Lao Khao (เหล้าขาว). The technique of distilling reached Okinawa from Thailand (formerly known as Ayutthaya Kingdom) in the 15th century, a time when Okinawa served as a major trading intermediary between Southeast Asia, China, and Japan.  All awamori is made from Thai rice ("thai-mai"). The Okinawans refined the distillation process, incorporating techniques from nearby countries, making it more suitable for the subtropical climate and incorporating the unique local black koji mold. From the 15th to 19th century, awamori was sent as a tribute to Okinawa's powerful neighbors, China and Japan.

Before April 1983, awamori was labelled as a second class shochu; it is now labelled as "authentic awamori". 

In 2017, facing declining sales in the home market, three of Okinawa's prominent Awamori distilleries combined their efforts to introduce awamori to overseas markets, specifically to the US and Europe. The product, labelled as RYUKYU 1429 Authentic Ryukyu Awamori made its European debut in the UK in June 2019.

Production
Although awamori is a distilled rice liquor, it differs from Japanese shochu in several ways. Awamori is made in a single fermentation while shochu usually uses two fermentations. Furthermore, awamori uses Thai-style, long-grained Indica crushed rice rather than the short-grained Japonica usually used in shochu production. Finally, awamori exclusively uses black koji mold (Aspergillus awamori) indigenous to Okinawa, while Japanese shochu uses white (aspergillus kawachii), black, and yellow (Aspergillus oryzae) koji molds.

Kusu

When awamori is aged for three years or more, it is called . This pronunciation, which derives from Okinawan, is unique to awamori; elsewhere in Japan, the word is pronounced "koshu" and refers to aged sake. Legally, in order to earn the designation "kusu", the awamori must be aged for a minimum of three years. If a specific age is noted, then all of the contents must be of at least that age. Awamori is aged underground in constant cool temperatures in clay pots or vases. Containers of awamori can be found in the caves of Okinawa.

Before the Battle of Okinawa during World War II, 200- and even 300-year-old kusu existed, but most of the oldest kusu were lost in the battle. However, the Shikina Distillery in Shuri own 100- and 150-year old kusu which are thought to be to be the oldest surviving. There are ongoing attempts to once again produce 200- and 300- year old kusu.

Hanazake
On Yonaguni, Japan's westernmost island, the three distilleries of Donan, Yonaguni and Maifuna produce a variant of awamori called , lit. "flower liquor", which has an alcohol content of 60%.  Originally intended for religious ceremonies, hanazake is traditionally consumed straight.

Etymology
The earliest known use of the term awamori (泡盛) is in a 1671 record of a gift from King Shō Tei of the Ryukyu Kingdom to the fourth shōgun, Tokugawa Ietsuna. Awamori was sent as a gift to the shogunate prior to 1671, but it was recorded as shōchū (焼酒 or 焼酎) in earlier records.

Several explanations exist for the etymology of the word awamori. The Okinawan historian Iha Fuyū believed that the name derives from the word for millet  (awa), compounded with a verb-derived noun meaning "heaped amount; serving" (mori). On this theory, the word was recorded incorrectly with the first character as "bubble, foam" (awa) rather than the character for millet (awa). Millet was a raw material used to make awamori at the time that the word was first used.

Another hypothesis is that the name comes from a method that was used in the past for assessing the quality of distilled liquors. This method was to slowly pour the liquor from a small bowl held in one hand into an empty bowl held in the other hand about one foot below. Longer-lasting bubbles were also seen as desirable.

See also

 Habushu
 List of rice beverages

Notes

References 
 Okinawa Prefectural Government, "Awamori", Okinawa: Cultural Promotion Division, Okinawa Tourism and Cultural Affairs Bureau, 1996.

External links 
 What is Awamori? 
RYUKYU1429 Awamori

Rice drinks
Japanese distilled drinks
Okinawan cuisine
Japanese drinks